Kevin Goodan is an American poet and professor. His most recent book is Spot Weather Forecast (Alice James Books, 2021). His first book, In the Ghost-House Acquainted, won a New England/New York Award from Alice James Books, as well as the 2005 L.L. Winship/PEN New England Award. His poems have been published in Ploughshares, Colorado Review, Crazyhorse, Mid-American Review, American Poet Magazine, Cutbank, and other journals.

Raised on the Flathead Indian Reservation in Western Montana, Goodan began working for the U.S. Forest Service at a young age. He has lived in Northern Ireland and western Massachusetts. He received his M.F.A. degree from the MFA Program for Poets & Writers at the University of Massachusetts Amherst and his B.A. degree from the University of Montana. He has taught at the University of Connecticut and as Visiting Writer at Wesleyan University. He was formerly employed at Lewis-Clark State College, and is currently an adjunct professor at Colby-Sawyer College.

Published works
Full-length Poetry Collections
 Spot Weather Forecast (Alice James Books, 2021)
 Anaphora (Alice James Books, 2018)
 Let the Voices (Red Hen Press, 2016)
 Upper Level Disturbances (Colorado State University/Center for Literary Publishing 2012)
 Winter Tenor (Alice James Books, 2009)
 In the Ghost-House Acquainted (Alice James Books, 2004)

Chapbooks
 Thine Embers Fly: Ten Poems (Factory Hollow Press, 2007)

Awards
2005 L. L. Winship/PEN New England Award, In the Ghost-House Acquainted
 New York/New England Award (Alice James Books)

References

External links
 The MFA Program for Poets & Writers at UMASS
 Audio: Kevin Goodan Reads His Poems for From the Fishouse
 Alice James Books website
 Book Review: Bookslut website
 Interview: What Is Orphan in Me: An interview with Kevin Goodan by Greogory Lawless > Friday, August 28, 2009
Interview in Rain Taxi Review of Books

Year of birth missing (living people)
Living people
American male poets
University of Massachusetts Amherst MFA Program for Poets & Writers alumni
University of Montana alumni
Wesleyan University faculty
Poets from Idaho
Poets from Montana
American academics of English literature
Lewis–Clark State College faculty
American male non-fiction writers